Rashid Mehmood (born 15 August 1987) is a Pakistani field hockey player who plays as a defender for Dutch club Schaerweijde and the Pakistan national team.

Club career
Rashid plays club hockey in the Netherlands since 2012 when he was signed by Oranje Zwart. After Oranje Zwart merged in 2016 with EMHC he started playing for the newly formed club HC Oranje-Rood. After his contract expired in 2019, he joined Schaerweijde.

International career

2012
Mehmood was included in the squad for the 2012 Olympic Games in London, UK.

References

External links
 

1987 births
Living people
Field hockey players from Bahawalpur
Pakistani male field hockey players
Male field hockey defenders
Field hockey players at the 2012 Summer Olympics
Field hockey players at the 2014 Asian Games
Field hockey players at the 2018 Asian Games
2018 Men's Hockey World Cup players
Olympic field hockey players of Pakistan
Asian Games silver medalists for Pakistan
Asian Games medalists in field hockey
Medalists at the 2014 Asian Games
Oranje Zwart players
HC Oranje-Rood players
Men's Hoofdklasse Hockey players
Expatriate field hockey players
Pakistani expatriates in the Netherlands
Hockey India League players